Frits de Ruijter (5 April 1917 – 20 March 2012) was a Dutch middle-distance runner. He competed in the men's 800 metres and men's 1500 metres events at the 1948 Summer Olympics.

References

External links
 

1917 births
2012 deaths
Athletes (track and field) at the 1948 Summer Olympics
Dutch male middle-distance runners
Olympic athletes of the Netherlands
Athletes from Rotterdam